Dale M. Erdey (born December 6, 1954) is a former Louisiana State Senator. He represented District 13 for 12 years, 20082020. Prior to that he was a member of the Louisiana House of Representatives from 1999 to 2007. Born in Hammond, Louisiana, Erdey graduated from Doyle High School and earned a B.S. at Louisiana State University.

References

1954 births
Living people
Louisiana local politicians
Republican Party Louisiana state senators
Louisiana State University alumni
Mayors of places in Louisiana
Republican Party members of the Louisiana House of Representatives
People from Hammond, Louisiana
People from Livingston Parish, Louisiana
Politicians from Baton Rouge, Louisiana
21st-century American politicians
American United Methodists